Carlos Enrique Rentería Olaya (born 5 July 1995) is a Colombian professional footballer who plays as a defensive midfielder for Portuguese club Torreense.

Club career
On 25 August 2021, he signed with Académico de Viseu in Portugal.

On 17 August 2022, Rentería moved to Torreense.

References

External links
 

1995 births
People from Buenaventura, Valle del Cauca
Sportspeople from Valle del Cauca Department
21st-century Colombian people
Living people
Colombian footballers
Association football midfielders
Deportivo Cali footballers
Tigres UANL footballers
FC Juárez footballers
Deportes Tolima footballers
Botafogo de Futebol e Regatas players
Sport Club do Recife players
Académico de Viseu F.C. players
S.C.U. Torreense players
Categoría Primera A players
Ascenso MX players
Campeonato Brasileiro Série A players
Liga Portugal 2 players
Colombian expatriate sportspeople in Mexico
Colombian expatriate sportspeople in Brazil
Colombian expatriate sportspeople in Portugal
Expatriate footballers in Mexico
Expatriate footballers in Brazil
Expatriate footballers in Portugal